Vui Clarence Joseph Nelson (born 22 December 1955) is a Samoan judge. He sits on the Supreme Court of Samoa, and was the first Pacific Islands judge appointed to the United Nations Committee on the Rights of the Child.

Nelson was born in Apia, Samoa, and educated at St. Joseph's College in Samoa and Timaru Boys' High School in New Zealand. He studied law at the University of Canterbury in Christchurch, New Zealand, graduating in 1977. He returned to Samoa in 1979, where he worked for the Office of the Attorney General and then in private practice. In 2000 he was appointed to the District Court of Samoa, becoming Senior District Court Judge in 2001. In 2006 he was appointed to the Supreme Court of Samoa. As a supreme court judge he decided the case of Police v Vailopa [2009], which set requirements for police interviews of child suspects. He also advocated for the creation of a sex offender's registry in Samoa, resulting eventually in the passage of the Sex Offenders Registration Act in 2018.

In 2014 Vui became the first Pacific Islands judge appointed to the United Nations Committee on the Rights of the Child. He was appointed for a second four-year term in 2018. In this role he criticised the Samoan government's attempted re-introduction of corporal punishment in schools.

In 2019 following the retirement of Patu Tiava'asu'e Falefatu Sapolu he was appointed acting Chief Justice of Samoa. He served in that role for almost a year before the appointment of Satiu Simativa Perese as Chief Justice in March 2020. On 30 November 2021 he was appointed as Senior Judge of the Supreme Court.

References

Living people
1955 births
People from Apia
Samoan judges
Samoan lawyers
University of Canterbury alumni
Samoan judges of international courts and tribunals